Žljebovi is a village in the municipality of Sokolac, Bosnia and Herzegovina. According to the 1991 census it has a population of 171 people.

References

Populated places in Sokolac